The Rules of Magic: The Gathering were originally developed by the game's creator, Richard Garfield, and accompanied the first version of the game in 1993. The rules of Magic have been changed frequently over the years by the manufacturer, Wizards of the Coast, mostly in minor ways. However, major rules overhauls have also been done a few times.

In its most-played form, Magic is a game where two players bring their own set of cards, called a deck, and play each other. Players start by drawing a hand of seven cards and then take turns. In a turn a player can play one mana-producing Land, play various types of spells which require varying amounts and colors of mana, and attack their opponent to try and reduce their life total from the starting 20 to zero, thus winning the game.

Overview 

A standard game of Magic involves two or more players who are engaged in a battle acting as powerful wizards, known as Planeswalkers. Each player has their own deck of cards, either one previously constructed or made from a limited pool of cards for the event. A player typically starts the game with a "life total" of twenty and loses the game when their life total is reduced to zero. A player can also lose if they must draw from an empty deck. Some cards specify other ways to win or lose the game. Additionally, one of the "Magic Golden Rules" is that "Whenever a card’s text directly contradicts these rules, the card takes precedence". CNET highlighted that the game has many variants; also, "Magic tends to embrace all that house ruling, making it official when it catches on. Commander started as a fan-created format, after all".

Formats 

There are various formats in which the Magic can be played. Each format provides additional rules for deck construction and gameplay, with many confining the pool of permitted cards to those released in a specified group of Magic card sets. Formats are divided into two main categories by the Wizards Play Network: Tournament and Casual. The term "sanctioned" refers to formats that the Wizards Play Network allows to be run at official events. Officially sanctioned events can also add additional rules such as disallowing proxy cards.

Players have also invented many alternative formats for playing the game, some of which have been embraced by Wizards of the Coast. Some of these formats utilize rules or sets of cards that differ from those used in sanctioned tournament play. One of the most popular formats of Magic is the Commander format which is technically a casual sanctioned format.

Formats can further be divided by if they are Constructed and Limited formats. Constructed formats require decks to be made prior to participation, with players allowed to use any tournament-legal cards they possess. Sanctioned Constructed formats include Standard, Modern, Legacy, and Vintage.  Limited formats, in contrast, utilize a restricted and unknown pool of cards, usually formed by opening Magic products. Limited competition require players to select cards and build decks on the fly within the tournament itself. The primary two sanctioned Limited formats are Sealed Deck and Booster Draft.

Deck construction 

Deck building requires strategy as players must choose among thousands of cards which they want to play. This requires players to evaluate the power of their cards, as well as the possible synergies between them, and their possible interactions with the cards they expect to play against (this "metagame" can vary in different locations or time periods). The choice of cards is usually narrowed by the player deciding which colors they want to include in the deck. Part of the Magic product line has been starter decks which are aimed to provide novice players with ideas for deck building. Players expand their card library for deck building through booster packs, which have a random distribution of cards from a specific Magic set and defined by rarity. These rarities are known as Common, Uncommon, Rare, and Mythic Rare, with more powerful cards generally having higher rarities.

Initial setup

Beginning and ending the game
Each player uses their own deck to play the game. In most formats, a deck must have a minimum of 60 cards; there is no maximum deck size, but a player must be able to shuffle their deck without assistance. Some formats have exceptions or additional limitations to the above rules. In tournaments, players may be allowed the use of a sideboard containing up to 15 cards. Sideboard cards can be swapped for cards in the main deck in between games.

At the beginning of a game, each player shuffles their deck and draws seven cards to form their starting hand. The players may choose to mulligan if they do not like their starting hand.

A player wins the game by eliminating all opponents. Players typically begin the game with 20 life and generally lose when their life total hits zero or they run out of cards in their deck, although there are other ways of losing the game.

London Mulligan 
The London Mulligan rule was implemented for all competitive Magic formats in 2019. In turn order, each player may decide to mulligan; that player shuffles their hand and library together and draws a new hand of seven cards.  A player can do this as many times as they wish. They then put a card on the bottom of their library for each time they took a mulligan.

Zones

At any given time, every card is located in one of the following "zones":

 Library: The portion of the player's deck that is kept face down and is normally in random order (shuffled).
 Hand: A player's hidden hand of cards that can be played. If a player has more than seven cards in hand at the end of their turn, any extras must be discarded.
 Battlefield: Cards that are in play and actively influencing the game.
 Graveyard: A player's discard pile. Typically, "creatures, enchantments, and artifacts stay on the playing field whereas sorceries and instants are placed in your discard pile [...] after casting their one-time effect".
 The stack: This is the place for spells and abilities that have been cast or played, but have not yet resolved.
 Exile: Cards that have been exiled by specific effects are put here. Unlike the graveyard, exile is "the place where cards go when they’re really dead and can't be replayed back into the game". 
 Command: In the Commander format, each players' commander is put here at the start of the game and returns when it leave the battlefield.

Terminology

Abilities
Types of abilities include:

 Activated abilities: abilities that have a cost and an effect, which are separated using a colon. A player may activate such an ability at any time by paying the cost.
 Triggered abilities: Abilities that begin with the word "when", "whenever", or "at". Whenever the trigger event occurs, the ability is put on the stack.
 Static abilities: abilities written as statements, that modify the rules of the game.

Keyword abilities

Some cards have abilities that are not fully explained on the card. These are known as "keyword" abilities, and consist of a word or phrase whose meaning is defined by the rules. Keyword abilities are usually given reminder text in the set in which they are introduced. There are over forty such abilities. In most cases, multiple instances of the same keyword on an object have no additional effect. Keywords can be classified into two different types: Evergreen or Mechanics. Evergreen keywords "can appear in absolutely any set, since its gameplay effects and flavor are flexible and generic enough to fit anywhere. Effects like trample, flying, deathtouch, first strike and haste are examples of this". Abilities classified as Mechanics are rotated in and out of the game as various expansions are released. Game Rant highlighted that "most planes have some unique rules that are only relevant on cards from specific sets" and that "new mechanics are constantly added to shake things up and give the players new tools to work with".

Mana
	
When a player uses an ability that produces mana, that mana is put in their "mana pool". There are five colors of mana: white, blue, black, red and green. Mana can also be colorless. Mana in the mana pool can be used to pay costs.

Types of cards

All objects that remain on the battlefield are called permanents. Types of permanents include lands, creatures, enchantments, artifacts, and planeswalkers. In contrast, sorceries and instants go to the graveyard immediately after they are used.

Lands
Land cards tap to produce mana that is used to cast spells and activate abilities. They cost no mana to play; however, a player may play no more than one land per turn, and only during the main phases of their own turn. There are six types of basic lands (Plains, Island, Swamp, Mountain, Forest, and Wastes), one for each color (plus Wastes for colorless). These lands can each be tapped to produce one mana of the appropriate color. Other lands are non-basic and may produce other combinations or amounts of mana, or may have other abilities. Playing a land does not use the stack and therefore occurs immediately, with no way for any player to stop it. Players are allowed to have any number of basic lands in a deck, whereas all other cards are limited to a maximum of four copies per deck.

Creatures
Creatures represent people or beasts that are summoned to the battlefield to attack opposing creatures or players and defend their controller from the attacks of enemy creatures. Creatures have two values that represent their strength in combat, printed on the lower right-hand corner of the card. The first number is the creature's power, the amount of damage it deals in combat. The second number is its toughness; if it receives that much damage in a single turn, the creature is destroyed and placed in the graveyard.

Creatures are divided into creature types, such as "goblin" or "wizard". Creatures of the same type often synergize well with each other, causing players to build decks based entirely on one type of creature.

Enchantments
Enchantments represent persistent magical effects; they are spells that remain on the battlefield and alter some aspect of the game. Some enchantments are attached to other cards on the battlefield (often creatures); these are known as Auras. These enchantments affect that card in some way, and are automatically put into the graveyard when the card they are enchanting leaves the battlefield.

Artifacts
Artifacts represent magical items, animated constructs, pieces of equipment, or other objects and devices. Like enchantments, artifacts remain on the battlefield until something removes them. Some artifacts are Equipment. Each equipment has a Equip cost, which a player can pay to give that equipment to one of their creatures, making the creature stronger. Unlike auras, which are destroyed when the object they are enchanting leaves play, equipment can be re-equipped by another creature if its original user leaves play.

Sorceries and instants
Sorceries and instants both represent one-shot or short-term magical spells. They never enter the battlefield. Instead, they take effect and then are immediately put into their owner's graveyard.

Sorceries and instants differ only in when they can be cast. Sorceries may only be cast during the player's own main phases, and only when the stack is empty. Instants, on the other hand, can be cast at any time, including during other players' turns and while another spell or ability is waiting to resolve.

Interrupts 
Prior to the introduction of the stack in 6th Edition, there was another type of spell called an "Interrupt". Interrupts functioned similarly to instants in that they could be played at any time, however players could only respond to interrupts with other interrupts and could not use instants or activate abilities.

Planeswalkers
According to Magic lore, the player is a "planeswalker", a wizard who can travel ("walk") between different realms or universes ("planes"); as such, planeswalker cards are meant to represent scaled-down versions of other players, with their decks represented by the card's abilities, and originally were designed to move through a roster of effects without player control, as though they had a mind of their own. Most planeswalkers are legendary and subject to the "legend rule" - if a player controls more than one legendary planeswalker with the same name, that player chooses one and puts the other into their owner's graveyard.

Planeswalkers' abilities are based on their loyalty, which is tracked with counters. Planeswalkers' loyalty abilities each have a positive or negative loyalty cost; this is how many counters must be added (if positive) or removed (if negative) to activate that ability. Regardless of the loyalty costs, a single planeswalker may only use one loyalty ability once per turn, and only on its controller's turn during their main phases. An amount of loyalty counters are also removed equal to any damage the planeswalker takes. A planeswalker with no loyalty counters, either through use of its abilities or through damage, is put into the player's graveyard.

Planeswalkers are not creatures, so they cannot directly attack or block. Creatures can attack an opponent's planeswalkers rather than the opponent themselves. Those creatures may be blocked normally, but if not blocked deal damage to the planeswalker instead of the player.

Gameplay

Phases 
Magic officially labels its gameplay phases "as Begin, Main Phase, Combat, Second Main Phase, and End".

Begin
The beginning phase is composed of three parts:

 Untap step: A player untaps all cards they control.
 Upkeep step: Then, any abilities that trigger on the "upkeep step" happen, starting with the player of the current turn. These often include cards that require mana payments every turn.
 Draw step: A player then draws a card. In two-player games, the player who takes the first turn does not draw a card for that turn.

No cards or abilities can be played during the untap step. During the upkeep and draw steps, however, players can cast instants and activate abilities as normal.

Main
The main phase occurs immediately after the draw step; in this phase, the player has option to put cards onto the field. They may play any card from their hand unless that card specifies otherwise, and as long as they have the mana to pay its casting cost. This includes creature, planeswalker, sorcery, instant, land, enchantment, and artifact cards. Players may play only one land per turn.

Combat
The combat phase is split into five steps. Aside from instants, activated abilities, and spells that are specifically noted as being able to be played at any time (e.g., creatures with flash), players may not cast spells during combat. Multiple creatures may attack at the same time, but the turn player may only declare their list of attackers once.

 Beginning of combat: Players have a chance to cast spells and activate abilities that may alter how combat progresses. As the most common example, only untapped creatures may attack, so the defending player may cast instants or activate abilities that will tap a creature, preventing it from attacking.
 Declare attackers: the player whose turn it is declares which creatures they control will attack. Both players are given a chance to cast instants and activate abilities after attackers have been declared.
 Declare blockers: the defending player chooses which creatures they will block with. A creature must be untapped in order for it to block. Each creature can only block a single attacker, but multiple defending creatures can block the same attacker. Both players are given a chance to cast instants and activate abilities after blockers have been declared.
Combat damage: attacking and blocking creatures deal damage; the stack is used to determine the order this occurs.
 End of combat: Nothing normally happens during this phase, although players have another opportunity to take actions.

Second main phase
The second main phase is identical to the first; the player may cast spells and play a land (if they haven't played one already).

End
The ending phase has two steps:

 End step: abilities that trigger "at the beginning of the end step" go on the stack. This is the last chance players have to cast instants or activate abilities this turn.
 Cleanup: the active player discards down to their maximum hand size, then simultaneously, all damage marked on permanents is removed and all "until end of turn" and "this turn" effects end. Players can only take an action during the cleanup step if an ability triggers, which is rare.

After this phase is completed, the next active player starts their turn at the beginning phase.

Paying costs

Tapping and untapping

Some spells or abilities require the player to tap a permanent as part of their cost, meaning that they cannot use the ability again for the remainder of the turn. A creature that attacks also gets tapped, but a creature that blocks does not. Furthermore, a tapped creature cannot be declared as an attacker or blocker.

At the beginning of each player's turn, that player untaps all cards they control (unless otherwise stated by a card's effect) and they can be tapped again as normal.

Mana costs and colors
Most cards other than lands have a mana cost. This is the amount of mana that must be spent to cast that card as a spell. Cards can require mana of any color or combination of colors, including generic costs that can be paid with mana of any color.

Screen Rant commented that "One of the more important aspects of constructing a deck is the mana ratio. This ratio determines how many basic land cards players will need in their deck in order to 'cast' spell cards for combat and defense when playing a game. Too much mana can lead to players becoming 'mana swamped' or pulling out mostly basic mana cards and not enough spell cards to attack. The opposite can also happen where players become 'mana starved' and have too little mana to play their spell cards. [...] There are a number of ways the calculate or estimate this more specifically, but a quick rule of thumb is that basic mana should make up approximately one-third of their Magic: The Gathering deck, or 20 to 24 cards in a 60-card deck".

Timing
When a player casts a spell or activates an ability, it does not immediately take effect. Instead, it is placed on the stack, allowing other players to respond to the ability. Most activated abilities, as well as instant spells, can be used on anybody's turn as responses in this manner. Each new spell or ability is put on top of the stack, with the newest on top and the oldest at the bottom. When nobody has more spells or abilities to add, spells and abilities on the stack resolve in top-to-bottom order.

Certain spells allow a player to counter other spells. These spells must be cast while the spells they will affect are still on the stack. If a spell is countered, it is moved from the stack to its owner's graveyard and does not resolve.

Playing lands and certain other special actions do not use the stack; they take effect immediately.

History 
Magic's Comprehensive Rules aim to "stabilize the rules" with errata and outline "special-case rulings". In April 1994, Wizards of the Coast made "the first attempt to formalize and simplify Magic rules" with the Revised Edition card set. This codification of rules streamlined many cards, introduced or clarified many terms, removed "the need for multiple artifact types" and "introduced the tap symbol". It also introduced the system of timing that is in similar form still used in the game today: LIFO ("last in, first out"), instead of spells being resolved simultaneously as they were in earlier editions. Spells were now announced in 'batches'. However, over the next year it became clear to Wizards of the Coast that the game needed a more detailed rulebook. This led to the development of the Comprehensive Rules which were introduced in mid-1995 with the Fourth Edition card set.

The Comprehensive Rules were again overhauled for the 1997 Fifth Edition card set. The Fifth Edition rules attempted to create a complete rulebook from which card interactions could be determined logically without the need for special-case rulings. "Fifth Edition rules changed interrupts to work remarkably like instants, simplified the attack, and introduced several 'new' concepts that had never had formal names (including phase costs and triggered abilities)." Fifth Edition also introduced on-card reminder text to keywords with the goal of helping beginners to learn the various keywords of the game more easily. The rules were reworked more drastically for the Classic Sixth Edition core set in 1999. Instead of spells resolving as complete batches players could now interact on the "stack" at any point, interrupts were removed from the game, combat damage used the stack, and the rules deactivating tapped artifacts and preventing tapped blockers from dealing damage were removed.

The next major rules update was a decade later with the Magic 2010 core set. Several rule changes were made with the goal of making the game terminology more flavorful such as renaming the "in play-zone" to "battlefield". The main change was that combat stopped using the stack, a change that was considered by many veterans of the game to reduce the strategic depth of combat situations although it was generally accepted that in many cases the difference would not affect the combat situation.

Banned and restricted cards 

Individual cards may be listed as "restricted", where only one copy can be included in a deck, or simply "banned", at the WPN's discretion. These limitations are usually for balance of power reasons, but have been occasionally made because of gameplay mechanics. For example, with the elimination of the "play for ante" mechanic in all formal formats, all such cards with this feature are banned. During the COVID-19 pandemic which drew more players to the online Magic games and generated volumes of data of popular deck constructions, Wizards was able to track popular combinations more quickly than in a purely paper game, and in mid-2020, banned additional cards that in specific combinations could draw out games far longer than desired.

Older cards have also been banned from all formal play by Wizards due to inappropriate racial or cultural depictions in their text or illustrations in the wake of the George Floyd protests, and their images have been blocked or removed from online Magic databases. This included a card called "Invoke Prejudice", which was displayed on the official card index site Gatherer "at a web URL ending in '1488', numbers that are synonymous with white supremacy."

References

Further reading

External links
 Magic: The Gathering Comprehensive Rules

Rules
Game rules